Blade II is a 2002 American superhero film directed by Guillermo del Toro and written by David S. Goyer, based on the Marvel Comics superhero Blade created by Marv Wolfman and Gene Colan. The film is the sequel to Blade (1998) and the second installment in the Blade trilogy. The plot follows the human-vampire hybrid Blade in his continuing effort to protect humans from vampires, finding himself in a fierce battle against a group of mutant vampires who seek to commit global genocide of both vampire and human races. Blade and his human allies are coerced into joining forces with a special elite group of vampires.

Blade II was released in the United States on March 22, 2002,  and was a box office success, grossing over $155 million. It received mixed reviews from critics, earning praise for its performances, atmosphere, direction, and action sequences, although its script and lack of character development have been criticized. The film was followed by Blade: Trinity (2004).

Plot
Blade searches Prague for his mentor Abraham Whistler, who was thought dead after being attacked by Deacon Frost, but was instead turned into a vampire and held prisoner for two years. Blade rescues Whistler and cures him. Whistler meets Scud, Blade's young new technician and marijuana smoker who likes rap music.

A pandemic is turning vampires into "Reapers", primal, mutant creatures with a ravenous thirst for blood and a highly infectious bite that transforms both human and vampire alike. In order to combat the Reapers, vampire overlord Eli Damaskinos sends his minion, Asad, and daughter Nyssa to strike a truce with Blade; who become reluctantly allies with the vampires. He teams up with the Bloodpack, an elite group of vampires originally assembled to kill him. The pack consists of Asad, Nyssa, Reinhardt, Chupa, Snowman, Priest, Verlaine, and her lover Lighthammer. Reinhardt hates Blade, and challenges him to fight, but in response Blade implants an explosive on his head to keep him in line.

They investigate a vampire nightclub where they encounter the Reapers and discover they are immune to most vampire weaknesses. The Reaper leader, Jared Nomak, arrives and holds Nyssa hostage. He tries to recruit Blade to his cause, citing their mutual hatred of vampires. Priest is bitten and mercy-killed, and Lighthammer is bitten but conceals the bite. Whistler disappears and Scud is attacked by several Reapers, which he drives off with UV lights. Blade fights Nomak, who is immune to Blade's weapons. As the sun rises, Nomak retreats and Whistler returns, revealing he has found the Reaper nest in the sewer. Nyssa dissects a dead Reaper and learns their hearts are encased in durable bone. Realizing UV light is their only weakness, Scud and Whistler make UV weapons for the team, as well as a UV-emitting bomb strong enough to take out the entire nest.

Entering the Reaper nest, the team spreads out. Lighthammer transforms into a Reaper and kills Snowman. Verlaine sacrifices herself to kill Lighthammer by exposing them both to sunlight. Chupa and Reinhardt attack Whistler, who sprays Chupa with a Reaper pheromone. This attracts a horde which kills Chupa and Whistler escapes. Asad and Nyssa are ambushed and Asad is killed. Blade saves Nyssa and uses the UV-bomb which kills all of the Reapers except for Nomak. Nyssa and Reinhardt manage to evade the blast, but Nyssa is seriously injured until Blade allows her to drink his blood to survive.

Damaskinos' forces betray and capture Blade, Whistler, and Scud. It is revealed that the Reapers exist as a result of Damaskinos' efforts to engineer a stronger breed of vampires. Nomak, the first Reaper, is his own son, whom Damaskinos considers a failure due to his weakness to sunlight. Scud reveals himself to be one of Damaskinos' familiars, but Blade, who already suspected this, kills him with the explosive he planted on Reinhardt earlier. Damaskinos plans to harvest Blade’s blood in order to develop an immunity to sunlight and create a new and entirely invincible breed of vampires. Whistler escapes Reinhardt and frees a nearly drained Blade, who falls into Damaskinos' blood pool, restoring his strength. He fights his way through Damaskinos' henchmen and kills Reinhardt.

Nomak enters Damaskinos' stronghold seeking revenge on his father. Nyssa betrays Damaskinos by sealing off their escape route to the heliport and Damaskinos is killed by Nomak after failing to negotiate with him. Nomak then bites Nyssa, drinking her blood. Blade and Nomak engage in battle and Blade stabs Nomak in his only weak spot. With his revenge complete, and wanting to end his suffering, Nomak kills himself with Blade's sword. Fulfilling Nyssa's wish of dying as a vampire, Blade takes her outside and embraces her as her body disintegrates due to the sunrise. Sometime later in London, Blade kills Rush, the vampire that escaped in Prague.

Cast
 Wesley Snipes as Eric Brooks / Blade: A half-vampire "daywalker" (a Dhampir) who hunts vampires. Wesley Snipes stated that while such a character is not going to have much emotional depth, he also said that "there's some acting involved in creating the character and making him believable and palatable".
 Kris Kristofferson as Abraham Whistler: Blade's human mentor and weaponsmith.
 Ron Perlman as Dieter Reinhardt: A member of the Bloodpack, who bears a particular grudge against Blade.
 Leonor Varela as Nyssa Damaskinos: An unapologetic-but-honourable, natural-born vampire and daughter to Damaskinos.
 Norman Reedus as Scud: A young, pot-smoking weaponsmith who aids Blade in Whistler's absence.
 Thomas Kretschmann as Eli Damaskinos: An ancient vampire who is obsessed with creating a superior race of vampires as his legacy.
 Luke Goss as Jared Nomak: Patient zero and carrier of the Reaper virus. He bears a grudge against his father, Eli Damaskinos, for creating him.
 Matt Schulze as Chupa: A pugnacious member of the Bloodpack who bears a particular grudge against Whistler.
 Danny John-Jules as Asad: A well-mannered member of the Bloodpack.
 Donnie Yen as Snowman: A mute swordsman and member of the Bloodpack.
 Karel Roden as Karel Kounen: A familiar, Damaskinos's human agent and lawyer.
 Marit Velle Kile as Verlaine: A red-haired member of the Bloodpack and the lover of Lighthammer. The script originally said that she was the twin sister of Racquel from the first movie.
 Daz Crawford as Lighthammer: A hulking, hammer-wielding member of the Bloodpack with facial tattoos.
 Tony Curran as Priest: An Irish-accented member of the Bloodpack.
 Santiago Segura as Rush: A vampire flunky in Prague.

Production
Following the success of the original film, New Line and Marvel made plans for a sequel in 1999. Goyer had planned to use Morbius but Marvel wanted to keep the character for a franchise of his own. Goyer compared the story to The Dirty Dozen. Guillermo del Toro was hired to direct Blade II by New Line production president Michael De Luca after Stephen Norrington turned down the offer to direct the sequel. Goyer and Frankfurt both admired director Guillermo del Toro and believed his dark sensibilities to be ideal for Blade II. Frankfurt first met del Toro when Frankfurt's design company, Imaginary Forces, did the title sequences for Mimic: "I admired Mimic and got to know Guillermo through that film. Both David Goyer and I have been fans of his since Cronos and were enthusiastic about him coming on board. Guillermo is such a visual director and has a very strong sense of how he wants a movie to look. When you sign on with someone like Guillermo you're not going to tell him what the movie should look like, you're going to let him run with it". Like Goyer, del Toro has a passion for comic books, in Goyer's comment: "Guillermo was weaned on comic books, as was I. I was a huge comic book collector, my brother and I had about twelve thousand comic books that we assembled when we were kids, so I know my background". Tippett Studio provided computer-generated visual effects, including digital doubles of some of the characters, while Steve Johnson and his company XFX were hired to create the prosthetic makeup and animatronic effects.

Del Toro was tired of the romantic concept of "vampires being tortured Victorian heroes" and wanted vampires to be scary again. 
Del Toro chose not to alter the script too much from the ideas created by Goyer and Snipes. According to del Toro: "I wanted the movie to have a feeling of both a comic book and Japanese animation. I resurrected those sources and viewed them again. I dissected most of the dailies from the first movie; I literally grabbed about four boxes of tapes and one by one saw every single tape from beginning to end until I perfectly understood where the language of the first film came from. I studied the style of the first one and I think Norrington used a tremendous narrative style. His work is very elegant".

Stepping back into Blade's shoes was a challenge Wesley Snipes relished: "I love playing this role. It's fun as an actor to test your skills at doing a sequel, to see if you can recreate something that you did". Peter Frankfurt added that "Wesley is Blade; so much of the character was invented by Wesley and his instincts are so spot on. He takes his fighting, his weapons and attitude very seriously. He's incredibly focused, but he's also very cool and fun".

Del Toro said that "Wesley knows Blade better than David Goyer, better than me, better than anyone else involved in the franchise. He instinctively knows what the character would and wouldn't do, and every time he twists something around, something better would come out".

Filming took place in the Czech Republic, at Prague Studios and Barrandov Studios, as well as London from March 12, 2001 and concluded on July 2 the same year.

Music

A soundtrack to the film was released on March 19, 2002 through Immortal Records and Virgin Records, and which featured collaborations between hip hop artists and electronic artists. This soundtrack appeared on four different Billboard charts, reaching number 26 on the Billboard 200. It spawned two singles: "Child of the Wild West" and "Mind What You Say".

Release

Home media
The New Line Platinum Series DVD contains several deleted scenes including a flashback sequence showing Blade's first meeting with Whistler, a music video for "Child Of The Wild West", performed by west coast hip-hop group Cypress Hill and featuring drum and bass performer Roni Size in the DVD Special Features on disc-2, VHS Capture and theatrical trailer.

A Blu-ray version was released in 2012.

Reception

Box office
Blade II was released on March 22, 2002. This was during a period of the year (months March and April) considered to be a bad time for sequels to be released. Despite this, the film became the highest-grossing film of the Blade series, making $80 million in the United States and $150 million worldwide. In its opening weekend, the film earned $32,528,016 from 2,707 theaters but dropped 59% of its earnings in its second week, which brought in $13.2 million. The intake is believed to be affected (in part) by the pull of NCAA basketball Final Four games. The film debuted in the United Kingdom at number one, making $3.6 million from 355 theaters and held the spot for the following week, where it had earned $7.9 million, despite a 47% decline. The film was also number one in Singapore, making $214,000 from 30 theaters.

Critical response
The site's consensus reads: "Though Blade II offers more of what worked in the original, its plot and character development appear to have been left on the cutting room floor." On Metacritic it has a weighted average score of 52 out of 100 based on reviews from 28 critics, indicating "mixed or average reviews". Audiences polled by CinemaScore gave the film an average grade of "B+" on an A+ to F scale.

Roger Ebert gave the film 3½ stars out of 4, stating: "Blade II is a really rather brilliant vomitorium of viscera, a comic book with dreams of becoming a textbook for mad surgeons". James Berardinelli gave the film 2½ stars out of 4: "Blade II is for those undiscriminating movie-goers who want nothing more from a trip to the multiplex than loud, raucous, mindless entertainment".

Video game 
A video game Blade II was released for the PlayStation 2 and Xbox on September 3, 2002. Reviews were generally negative.

Sequel

A sequel, Blade: Trinity, was released in 2004.

See also

 Vampire films

References

External links

 
 
 
 
 
 Blade II at Marvel.com
 Blade II script 

Blade (comics) films
Blade (franchise)
2002 films
2002 horror films
2002 science fiction action films
2000s action horror films
2000s English-language films
2000s superhero films
2000s monster movies
American superhero films
American science fiction action films
American action horror films
American sequel films
Czech-language films
Romanian-language films
Films set in 1999
Films scored by Marco Beltrami
Films directed by Guillermo del Toro
Films produced by Peter Frankfurt
Films produced by Wesley Snipes
Films set in London
Films set in Prague
Films shot in the Czech Republic
Films shot in London
Films shot in Toronto
Films about genetic engineering
Martial arts horror films
Superhero horror films
New Line Cinema films
Kung fu films
American neo-noir films
Films with screenplays by David S. Goyer
Patricide in fiction
Sororicide in fiction
American vampire films
African-American horror films
African-American superhero films
Serbian-language films
2000s American films
Live-action films based on Marvel Comics